Robin Robertson  (born in 1955) is a Scottish poet.

Biography
  
Robertson  was brought up on the north-east coast of Scotland, but has spent most of his professional life in London. After working as an editor at Penguin Books and Secker and Warburg, he became poetry and fiction editor at Jonathan Cape.

Robertson's poetry appears regularly in the London Review of Books and The New York Review of Books, and is represented in many anthologies. In 2004, he edited Mortification: Writers' Stories of Their Public Shame, which collects seventy commissioned pieces by international authors. In 2006 he published The Deleted World, new versions of the Swedish poet Tomas Tranströmer, and in 2008 a new translation of Medea, which has been dramatised for stage and radio. Robertson was a trustee of the Griffin Trust for Excellence in Poetry (and is now a trustee emeritus).

Awards
Robertson's first volume of poetry, A Painted Field, won the 1997 Forward Prize for Best First Collection and the Scottish First Book of the Year Award. Slow Air followed in 2002, and his third book, Swithering, was published in 2006, winning the Forward Prize for Best Collection. In 2004, Robertson received the E. M. Forster Award from The American Academy of Arts and Letters. In 2009 he was elected a Fellow of the Royal Society of Literature He completed the set of Forward Prizes in 2009 when "At Roane Head" won the award for Best Single Poem. This poem is included in his fourth collection, The Wrecking Light (2010), a volume shortlisted for the 2010 Forward Prize, the Costa Poetry Award and the T.S. Eliot Prize. In 2013 he was honorably awarded the international, German Petrarca-Preis, sharing it with Adonis. In 2013, his book Hill of Doors was shortlisted for the 2013 Costa Book Awards (Poetry). His narrative poem, The Long Take, won the Goldsmiths Prize for innovative fiction. In 2019 it won him the 10th Walter Scott Prize, making him the first Scot and first poet to win the award. It was shortlisted for the 2018 Man Booker Prize. In 2019 he was a contributor to A New Divan: A Lyrical Dialogue Between East and West (Gingko Library).

Poetry collections 
 A Painted Field Picador, 1997. ; Houghton Mifflin Harcourt, 1999, 
 Slow Air, Harcourt, 2002. 
(editor) 
 
 Tomas Tranströmer, The Deleted World Enitharmon Press, 2006. 
 Euripides, Medea, Random House, 2008. 
 
 Hill of Doors, Picador, 2013. 
 Sailing the Forest: Selected Poems, Farrar, Straus and Giroux, 2014. 
 Euripides, Bacchae, Harper Collins, 2014. 
 The Long Take, Picador,  2018. 
 Grimoire, Picador,  2020.

References

External links 
 
 "A Celtic Mage’s Muses", Open Letters Monthly, Marc Vincenz
 Griffin Poetry Prize biography
 Poetry Archive profile, with poems and audio recordings
  Contemporary Writers profile.
 Profile at the Poetry Foundation
 Robertson poems at Poets.org
 " The Wrecking Light by Robin Robertson", Review of the collection Guardian 20 February 2010.

Living people
Fellows of the Royal Society of Literature
1955 births
Translators of Ancient Greek texts
Walter Scott Prize winners
Goldsmiths Prize winners